Pinus pumila × P. sibirica is a putative hybrid of Japanese stone pine (P. pumila) and Siberian pine (P. sibirica). It has not yet been officially described.

Description 

The trunk is not vertical, it is often curved.

Maximum height (from 1.5 to 3 m depending on light and soil conditions) is reached at 100–150 years, and then height remains more or less constant. Once the tree reaches a height of 4–5 m (rarely 6–7 m and higher) damage to the branches becomes inevitable. The broken branches can take root, the ability to produce specialized roots from latent buds inherited from P. pumila. These traits vary among sites where the hybrids are found.

The pine cones of the tree resemble the cones of the Siberian pine (P. sibirica). The cones are larger and thicker and not as much elongated as Japanese stone pine (P. pumila) cones. On average the cones are 4 cm long and 3 cm wide. Each cone contains 40 nut-like seeds. Seeds are on average 8 mm long. Only about 15% (at most) of the seeds in the cones are fertile. Ripe cones are purple, just like those of P. sibirica. Seed development and production are very poor in the putative hybrids, indicating that introgression occurs very slowly or does not occur beyond the first filial generation.

Distribution and habitat 
Pinus pumila × P. sibirica naturally occurs in the Baikal region of Siberia (Russia) where P. pumila and P. sibirica ranges overlap, that is Irkutsk Oblast, some parts of Yakutia and Buryatia. At altitudes of 2,000 to 2,100 m (timberline), Japanese stone pine and dwarfed, sterile Siberian stone pine occur together. This increases the chances of hybridization between the two species.

In the depression near Chortovo Lake (51°29'N 103°35'E), the Pinus pumila × P. sibirica trees possess the intermediate traits compared with parental species, whereas on the slopes, they acquire a creeping form and can only be distinguished from P. pumila by their large, purple cones.

See also 
 Hybridization in pines

References 

pumila sibirica
Interspecific plant hybrids
Flora of Irkutsk Oblast
Plant nothospecies